Caspar Wistar Hodge Sr. (February 21, 1830 – September 27, 1891) was an American theologian. Like his father Charles Hodge, he taught at Princeton Theological Seminary, serving as Professor of New Testament.

Hodge studied at the College of New Jersey and Princeton Seminary. He taught at the seminary from 1861 until his death.

Hodge published very little work. James H. Moorhead suggests that "his father's commanding reputation may have set the bar of achievement so high that Wistar was reluctant to put his thoughts into print." Moorhead also notes that although his theological convictions "represented the rock-ribbed orthodoxy for which his father had contended," the younger Hodge "did not see himself as a controversialist".

Hodge's son, Caspar Wistar Hodge Jr., also taught at Princeton Seminary.

References

1830 births
1891 deaths
Princeton University alumni
Princeton Theological Seminary alumni
Princeton Theological Seminary faculty
American biblical scholars
New Testament scholars